The Girl from Fano is a 1941 German drama film directed by Hans Schweikart and starring Brigitte Horney, Joachim Gottschalk and Gustav Knuth. The film is based on a novel by Günther Weisenborn and is set amongst the fishing community of the Danish island of Fanø.

Cast
 Brigitte Horney as Patricia
 Joachim Gottschalk as Fischer Ipke
 Gustav Knuth as Fischer Frerk
 Viktoria von Ballasko as Ipkes Frau Angens
 Gerhard Bienert as Hinnerk
 Paul Bildt as Kapellmeister Breitling
 Helmut Brasch as Klaus
 Karl Dannemann as Bootsmann
 Walter Hillbring as Bootsverleiher
 Luise Hohorst as Krankenschwester
 Fritz Hoopts as Leuchtturmwärter Jens
 Hans Kraft as Reisender
 Wilhelm P. Krüger as Dusenschön
 Justus Paris as Dr. Sperling
 Joachim Pfaff as Kind
 Fritz Reiff as Patentanwalt
 Heddo Schulenburg as Schiffsjunge
 Charlotte Schultz as Berthe
 Isa Vermehren as Volig
 Franz Weber as Friseur
 Paul Wegener as Ulerk Ohm
 Helmut Weiss as Eleganter Herr

References

Bibliography 
 Hake, Sabine. Popular Cinema of the Third Reich. University of Texas Press, 2001.

External links 
 

1941 films
1941 drama films
German drama films
Films of Nazi Germany
1940s German-language films
Films directed by Hans Schweikart
Films based on German novels
Films set in Denmark
Films set on islands
Films about fishing
Bavaria Film films
German black-and-white films
1940s German films